Niemann-Pick C1-Like 1 (NPC1L1) is a protein found on the gastrointestinal tract epithelial cells as well as in hepatocytes.  Specifically, it appears to bind to a critical mediator of cholesterol absorption.

The drug ezetimibe inhibits NPC1L1 causing a reduction in cholesterol absorption, resulting in a blood cholesterol reduction of between 15-20%. Polymorphic variations in NPC1L1 gene could be associated with non-response to ezetimibe treatment.

NPC1L1 has been shown to be an accessory receptor for hepatitis C virus entry into cells, and thus ezetimibe might be used as a therapeutic strategy.

As cancer appeared more frequently in patients treated with simvastatin-ezetimibe combination therapy in one clinical trial, it had been hypothesized that NPC1L1 by ezetimibe might be associated with an increase cancer risk.  However a meta-analysis of ezetimibe clinical data showed no increased risk of cancer from treatment with ezetimibe.

References

External links